Watervale (1908 – 1921) was an American Thoroughbred racehorse of exceptional speed who set two track records in the United States and a national record in Canada.

Background

Bred at August Belmont Jr.'s Nursery Stud near Lexington, Kentucky, Watervale's dam was the retrospective American Champion Two-Year-Old Filly for 1892. His British-born sire, Watercress, was a winner of the 1892 Prince of Wales's Stakes who was imported to the United States by prominent breeder, James Ben Ali Haggin. Watercress also sired the very good filly, Rhine Maiden. His grandsire, Springfield, was bred by Queen Victoria and was a winner of the first two runnings of the July Cup in 1876-1877 at Newmarket Racecourse.

Racing career

Among his races at age two, Watervale won a six furlong race for his age group at Sheepshead Bay Race Track and finished third in the Grand Union Hotel Stakes at Saratoga Race Course.

Racing at age three, on May 1, 1911 Watervale equaled the Pimlico track record of 1:12 1/5 for six furlongs. Ridden by Eddie Dugan, on May 17, 1911 Watervale set another Pimlico track record of 1:51 flat for 1⅛ miles in winning an American Classic, the Preakness Stakes. On July 5, 1911, Watervale broke the Canadian record for a mile and a furlong when he won the feature race at Fort Erie Racetrack in Fort Erie, Ontario. His winning time of 151 2/5 was achieved despite being slowed by his jockey before the finish line.

Stud career
At stud, Watervale met with limited success as a sire. He was euthanized at the Military Stock Farm after becoming blind in October 1921.

Pedigree

References

1908 racehorse births
1921 racehorse deaths
Racehorses bred in Kentucky
Racehorses trained in the United States
Preakness Stakes winners
Belmont family
Thoroughbred family 4-r